Svein Erling "Matta" Mathisen (30 September 1952 – 27 January 2011) was a footballer from Norway. With the exception of a short spell with Scottish club Hibernian in 1978, "Matta" played for IK Start throughout his career, where he won the Norwegian league title in 1978 and 1980. Mathisen was capped 25 times for Norway, scoring twice.

Playing attacking midfielder or striker, Mathisen played 327 top-tier league matches, and scored 106 goals. Both numbers are club records, and when he retired in 1989 he also held the domestic "matches played" record. It has later been beaten by Ola By Rise, Roar Strand, Christer Basma, Erik Hoftun and Bjørn Johansen.

In 2010, Mathisen was diagnosed with stomach cancer, and began treatment for it, but he continued to play football and appear on television. In an interview with Verdens Gang, Mathisen said the sickness had taught him to love the little things in life, and that he was optimistic about his recovery.

Svein Mathisen died in his sleep from cancer in the early hours of 27 January 2011, nearly six months after being diagnosed. His last public appearance had been at a local football tournament just a few days prior. Several football personalities expressed grief over his death, and his old club IK Start cancelled all activities for the day.

Mathisen's son Jesper is also a footballer, who plays as a central defender or defensive midfielder for IK Start. He is also a former under-21 international for Norway.

References

External links 

 
 

1952 births
2011 deaths
Sportspeople from Kristiansand
Association football midfielders
Norwegian footballers
Norway international footballers
Eliteserien players
IK Start players
Hibernian F.C. players
Scottish Football League players
Norwegian expatriate footballers
Expatriate footballers in Scotland
IK Start non-playing staff
People from Sauda